Glendale is an unincorporated community in Le Flore County, Oklahoma, United States.

History
The first post office at Glendale opened in 1910.

References

Unincorporated communities in Oklahoma
LeFlore County, Oklahoma